A referendum on reducing the voting age from 23 to 21 was held in Denmark on 30 May 1961. It was approved by 55% of voters with a 37.3% turnout.

The electoral age in Denmark had previously been lowered from 25 to 23 in a 1953 referendum, and was further reduced to 20 years following a 1971 referendum and finally to 18 years following a 1978 referendum.

Results

References

Referendums in Denmark
Denmark
Electoral age referendum
Suffrage referendums
Electoral reform in Denmark
May 1961 events in Europe